Grimville is an unincorporated community in Greenwich Township in Berks County, Pennsylvania, United States. Grimville is located at the intersection of Old Route 22 and Long Lane. It is situated just east of Krumsville with its access to Interstate 78.

References

Unincorporated communities in Berks County, Pennsylvania
Unincorporated communities in Pennsylvania